This list of castles in Normandy is a list of medieval castles or château forts in the regions of Lower Normandy and Upper Normandy in northern France.

Links in italics are links to articles in the French Wikipedia.

Calvados

Castles of which little or nothing remains include 
Château d'Olivet.

Eure

Manche

Castles of which little or nothing remains include 
Château Ganne.

Orne

Seine-Maritime

See also
 List of castles in France
 List of châteaux in France

References

Buildings and structures in Normandy